

The Farman F.51 was a 1920s French maritime reconnaissance flying boat designed and built by Farman. The F.51 was an unequal-span four-bay biplane flying boat with a crew of four. It was powered by two Lorraine 8bd engines mounted in tractor configuration. A pusher engined version was designated the Farman F.50 (even though the designation had been used before in 1919).
Tested by the French Navy but it failed to win any orders, Farman did briefly consider a civil version but the project was abandoned.

Variants
F.50
Two Lorraine 8bd V-8 piston engines in pusher-configuration.
F.51
Two Lorraine 8bd V-8 piston engines in tractor-configuration.

Operators

Brazilian Naval Aviation

Specifications (F.51)

See also

References
 The Illustrated Encyclopedia of Aircraft (Part Work 1982–1985), 1985, Orbis Publishing, Page 1737

1920s French military reconnaissance aircraft
Flying boats
F.0051
Biplanes
Aircraft first flown in 1922
Twin piston-engined tractor aircraft